The III. Hornspitze is a mountain in the Zillertal Alps on the border between Tyrol, Austria, and South Tyrol, Italy.

References 
 Heinrich Klier, Walter Klier: Alpenvereinsführer Zillertaler Alpen. Rother Verlag, München 1996, 
 Eduard Richter (Redaktion): Die Erschließung der Ostalpen, III. Band, Verlag des Deutschen und Oesterreichischen Alpenvereins, Berlin 1894
 Mittheilungen des Deutschen und Oesterreichischen Alpenvereins, Nr. 9, München 1886
 Raimund von Klebelsberg: Geologie von Tirol, Berlin 1935
 Alpenvereinskarte 1:25.000, Blatt 35/2, Zillertaler Alpen, mittleres Blatt

Mountains of the Alps
Mountains of Tyrol (state)
Mountains of South Tyrol
Alpine three-thousanders
Zillertal Alps
Austria–Italy border
International mountains of Europe